Jason Gerhard is an American politician. He serves as a Republican member for the Merrimack 25th district of the New Hampshire House of Representatives.

Life and career 
Gerhard was born in Long Island, New York.

In September 2022, Gerhard defeated Kenna Cross in the Republican primary election for the Merrimack 25th district of the New Hampshire House of Representatives, comprising the city of Franklin and the town of Northfield. In November 2022, he defeated Deborah Wheeler in the general election, winning 55 percent of the votes. He assumed office in December 2022.

References 

Living people
Year of birth missing (living people)
People from Long Island
Republican Party members of the New Hampshire House of Representatives
21st-century American politicians